Kabir Chaura is a locality in Varanasi, India. It is known as the place where the great mystic poet and saint Kabir grew up. The word 'Chaura' is a distortion of 'Chauraha', literally meaning a four-way crossing (chau meaning "four"; raha meaning "way"). Kabir Chaura is also known as the home of Indian musicians and dancers Kishan Maharaj, Gopi Krishan, Samta Prasad and the brothers Rajan and Sajan Mishra.

References

Neighbourhoods in Varanasi